Aleksandar Kobac (born 25 April 1971, in Belgrade) is a Serbian composer and arranger. In fifteen years of work he has more than three thousand songs and over three hundred hits. In 2005 he participated with group Flamingosi and song " Crazy summer dance" in Beovizija festival. In 2008 with Stefan Filipovic and song "Forever love" participated in Eurovision. In 2009 with Marko Kon and Milan Nikolic with song "Shoe" participated in Beovizija and same year in Moscow in Eurovision festival. Aleksandar Kobac has cooperated with Bulgarian, Macedonian, Montenegro, Bosnian and Croatian singers. He is doing music for TV show like Ciao Darwin, Amiga Show, and also industrial and advertising music.

References 

1971 births
Music arrangers
Serbian composers
Living people